This is a complete list of people who have served as President of the Oregon State Senate.

See also
 List of speakers of the Oregon House of Representatives
 Lists of Oregon-related topics

References

 
Presidents